Keter Torah Synagogue is a Jewish Synagogue in the Tunisian city of Sousse.

History 
The city of Sousse has had a large Tunisian Jewish community dating back to the Punic period. An 1853 census counted 400 Jewish families in Sousse.

It is in this context that Keter Torah Synagogue was built in 1913 at the initiative of Yossef Guez, Chief Rabbi of Sousse and the first native Tunisian Chief Rabbi. The synagogue is the main synagogue in the city.

In 1946, the Jewish community in Sousse numbered 3,500 but continued to decrease. As of 2006, there are 36 Jews left in Sousse. Sousse once had six synagogues, today only Keter Torah is still operational.

On December 6, 2019, the National Heritage Institute of Tunisia announced that the synagogue was placed on the list of heritage sites of the Islamic World Educational, Scientific and Cultural Organization.

References

Bibliography

See also 

 History of the Jews in Tunisia

Synagogues in Tunisia